Duško Tadić (born 1 October 1955, SR Bosnia and Herzegovina, SFR Yugoslavia) is a Bosnian Serb politician, former SDS leader in Kozarac and a former member of the paramilitary forces supporting the attack on the district of Prijedor. 

He was convicted of crimes against humanity, grave breaches of the Geneva Conventions, and violations of the customs of war by the International Criminal Tribunal for the Former Yugoslavia (ICTY) for his actions in the Prijedor region, including the Omarska, Trnopolje and Keraterm detention camps. He was sentenced to 20 years of imprisonment.

Trial
Tadić was arrested by German police in Munich in February 1994. He faced twelve counts of crimes against humanity, twelve counts of grave breaches of the Geneva Conventions, and ten counts of violations of the customs of war, to all of which he pleaded not guilty. His trial was to be held together with Goran Borovnica's, but Borovnica went missing in 1995 and was later declared dead.

On May 7, 1997, the Trial Chamber II found Tadić guilty on 9 counts and partially guilty on 2 counts. Tadić and the prosecution appealed on a number of grounds. One of the arguments required the court to determine whether or not the court was legitimate in its exercise of jurisdiction. Tadić argued that the court was illegitimately created through the United Nations Security Council. His argument was based upon separation of powers. He essentially argued that the Security Council was an executive governmental branch and thus did not have the power to create a judicial body.

To resolve this argument, the court was forced to determine whether it was legitimately formed through the United Nations Security Council. The court's analysis began by determining if this was an issue of jurisdiction. It explained that this may not be a jurisdiction issue when jurisdiction is given a narrow definition. It then noted that a narrow definition of jurisdiction is not warranted in the international context. Thus it determined that Tadić's argument was one of jurisdiction.

Next, the court went on to determine whether it had the power to evaluate its own jurisdiction. In coming to a conclusion, the court explained that a tribunal, in the international context, must assert its own jurisdiction within the bounds of the council that forms it. Consequently, it determined that it doesn't have the power to determine the «validity of its establishment by the security council.

A significant issue at trial was the use of protective measures for several witnesses, such as anonymity (including keeping their names from the defence), submission of evidence from a room separate from the courtroom, and the distortion of the voices and images. The majority of the Trial Chamber allowed this motion on the basis that the Tribunal had a duty 'to protect witnesses who are genuinely frightened'. However, Judge Stephen dissented, arguing that it was unreasonable to ask the defence to cross-examine a witness who amounted to a 'disembodied and distorted voice transmitted by electronic means.'

Another notable incident during the trial was the breach by the defence of the anonymity order with relation to Witness L, who revealed on cross-examination that he had lied about the death of his father and had been trained to give evidence at the Tribunal by the Bosnian government.

Upon Tadić's appeal of the ruling, he was found guilty of several more charges. In 2000, the ICTY found Tadić's lawyer, Milan Vujin, guilty of contempt of court. According to Tadić, Vujin was more interested in defending the interests of Serbia than of defending the interest of his client. This ruling had no outcome on the sentencing of Tadić. After serving his sentence until September 2000 in the Hague, he was transferred to a prison in Munich, Germany. He was granted early release from prison on 17 July 2008 and is living in Serbia.

References

1955 births
Living people
People convicted by the International Criminal Tribunal for the former Yugoslavia
People indicted by the International Criminal Tribunal for the former Yugoslavia
People from Prijedor
Serbs of Bosnia and Herzegovina convicted of war crimes
Serbs of Bosnia and Herzegovina convicted of crimes against humanity
Bosnia and Herzegovina people imprisoned abroad
Prisoners and detainees of Germany
People extradited from Germany